The McGill–Queen's University Press (MQUP) is a joint venture between McGill University in Montreal, Quebec and Queen's University at Kingston in Kingston, Ontario.

McGill–Queen's University Press publishes original peer-reviewed works in most areas of the social sciences and humanities. It currently has more than 2,500 books in print. For more than twenty-five years, the publishing house has been under the direction of executive director Philip Cercone, a former director of Canada's Awards to Scholarly Publishing Program, the governmental agency that funds scholarly books published in Canada. Under Cercone's guidance, the list has grown to the point where MQUP is sometimes claimed to be Canada's leading academic publisher. For many years, one of its senior editors was the historian and author Donald Akenson.

The press is currently a member of the Association of University Presses.

Publications
Among the best-known academics to have published with the press are Jacob Neusner, Margaret Somerville, Stéphane Dion, Charles Taylor, Bruce Trigger and Christl Verduyn. It also has a poetry list including such writers as Carmine Starnino, Mark Abley, Peter Dale Scott and Brian Bartlett. In recent years the press has also become known for contentious books on Canadian politics by Tom Flanagan among others. Some of its books are translated from French. 

McGill–Queen's has been awarded numerous prizes for the design of its books, as well as for editorial quality.

History
McGill–Queen's University Press began as McGill in 1961 and amalgamated with Queen's in 1969.

References

External links

McGill University
Publishing companies established in 1969
Queen's University at Kingston
University presses of Canada